Bogroiser is a celebration that comes from Macedonia, it means Virgin Mary. Bogroiser is in August. At Bogroiser, all the Macedonians from each village get together and dance and eat dinner. Bogroiser is an all night celebration. Some people dress in Macedonian costumes: some are different from others because every village has a different costume. The music that the Macedonians dance to is Macedonian folk songs e.g. Makedonsko devojce

Macedonian culture